Carlisle is an English habitational surname related to the city of Carlisle. Notable people with the surname include:

Alexandra Carlisle, English actress
Anthony Carlisle, surgeon and discover of electrolysis
Belinda Carlisle, American singer, of the Go-Go's
Bob Carlisle, American Christian singer
Clarke Carlisle, English footballer
Cliff Carlisle, American singer
Cooper Carlisle, American Football player with the Oakland Raiders
Elsie Carlisle, English singer, popular in the 1920s and 1930s
Geno Carlisle, American basketball player
James Carlisle, former Governor-General of Antigua and Barbuda
Jodi Carlisle, American actress
John Carlisle (disambiguation):
John Carlisle (actor), British television and stage actor
John Carlisle Kilgo, American Methodist bishop
John Carlisle (British politician), Conservative MP
John Griffin Carlisle, late 19th century Democratic Party politician in America
Kenneth Carlisle, British Conservative MP
Kitty Carlisle, American singer, actress and spokeswoman for the arts
Lindsey Carlisle, South African field hockey player
Lucas Carlisle, English cricketer
Mark Carlisle, British Conservative Cabinet member and MP
Mary Carlisle, American actress and singer
Mary Jane Goodson Carlisle (1835-1905), Acting First Lady of the United States
Michael Carlisle, British engineer and public servant
Orville Carlisle, American inventor of model rocketry
Peter Carlisle, the Prosecuting Attorney of Honolulu, Hawaii
Phyllis Cook Carlisle (1912–1954), Canadian architect
Rick Carlisle, American basketball player and coach
Stuart Carlisle, Zimbabwean cricketer

See also

Carlisle (disambiguation)
Earl of Carlisle
Carlyle (disambiguation)
Carlile (surname)

References

English toponymic surnames